The governor of Sulu, is the chief executive of the provincial government of Sulu.

Provincial Governors (1987-2025)

References

Governors of Sulu
Sulu